Lori Hartwell (born 1966) is the Founder and President of the Renal Support Network, author of Chronically Happy: Joyful Living in Spite of Chronic Illness, and co-host of KidneyTalk, a biweekly webcast of issues of interest to those with Chronic Kidney Disease (CKD).

CKD history 
Diagnosed with CKD at the age of 2 in 1968, Hartwell has had 12 years of dialysis and four transplants.

Renal Support Network 
Hartwell founded the Renal Support Network (RSN) in 1993 as an American nonprofit, kidney patient-focused, kidney patient-run organization to benefit individuals affected by CKD. Hartwell began an annual Renal Teen Prom in 1999. As of 2008 nine Renal teen Proms have been held in Los Angeles and one in Washington DC.

KidneyTalk 
Hartwell co-hosts a bi-weekly webcast called "KidneyTalk" with Stephen Furst. The shows run about 30 minutes covering topics of interest to those with CKD. KidneyTalk's first show was on June 6, 2006.

Awards 
 Received the "2003 Quality of Life" award from Nephrology News & Issues Magazine
 In October 2005 received the “Women in Business Award,” presented by the California State Legislature
 Named "2005 Woman of the Year" by California State Senator Jack Scott.

Publications 
Hartwell has contributed to several educational and scientific publications including in peer-reviewed journals.

Bibliography 
 Hartwell, Lori. (2002). Chronically Happy: Joyful Living In Spite Of Chronic Illness Poetic Media Press.

References

External links 
 Hartwell Communications
 RSNhope.org
 KidneyTalk Podcast
 Renal Teen Prom

American health care businesspeople
1960s births
Living people
American activists
American non-fiction writers
American motivational writers
Women motivational writers
American women non-fiction writers
21st-century American women